Pepsi Zero Sugar (sold under the names Diet Pepsi Max until early 2009 and then Pepsi Max until August 2016), is a zero-calorie, sugar-free, formerly ginseng-infused cola sweetened with aspartame and acesulfame K, marketed by PepsiCo. It originally contained nearly twice the caffeine of Pepsi's other cola beverages. Before a recipe change in late 2022, Pepsi Zero Sugar contained 69 milligrams of caffeine per 355 ml (12 fl oz), versus 36 milligrams in Diet Pepsi.

In autumn 2016, PepsiCo renamed the drink Pepsi Zero Sugar from Pepsi Max. A new logo was introduced in 2020.

History
Diet Pepsi Max was introduced in the United States on June 1, 2007, and in Canada in March 2008.  "Diet" was dropped from the name in early 2009.

In 2007, the official marketing website for the product contained an 'odd cast' featuring a spoofed telethon urging viewers to donate yawns and uses the slogan 'WAKE UP PEOPLE'. Also, there was a featured commercial of a spoof on the Dallas Cowboys offensive coordinator yawning, when calling a play, thus, causing Tony Romo to be sacked, he was then replaced by Cowboys' owner Jerry Jones who gives him a Diet Pepsi Max.  The scene then cuts away to the words "WAKE UP PEOPLE" while a voiceover shouts the slogan. An ad for the product that ran during Super Bowl XLII featured the song "What Is Love" by Haddaway, and showed people sleeping in inappropriate places and at inappropriate times, while bobbing their heads to the rhythm of the song. 

For Super Bowl XLIV in July 2010, Pepsi Max did a reboot of a well-received ad that ran during the 1995 Super Bowl XXIX.  In the original ad, a pair of delivery drivers from Coca-Cola and Pepsi began a tentative friendship while listening to "Get Together" by The Youngbloods; in a peacemaking gesture, the two rivals taste each other's soda. But the friendship ends in humorous conflict when the Coca-Cola driver refuses to return the (superior) Pepsi product. The new ad riffed on the same story, with the drivers this time coming to blows over the then-Pepsi Max at the expense of Coca-Cola's much more popular Coke Zero, with the song "Why Can't We Be Friends?" by the American funk band War as the soundtrack. 

In 2011, Snoop Dogg was featured in an ad campaign around the time of Super Bowl XLV.

In early 2010, Pepsi released a limited edition called "Pepsi Max Cease Fire." It is Diet Pepsi Lime in the Pepsi Max formula, and is being cross-promoted with Doritos Burn flavors.  In July 2010, Pepsi Zero Sugar, then under the Pepsi Max name, was once again redesigned, this time to match its global branding.  In the process, Pepsi Max began using the medium-sized "smile."  The "Max" typeface was changed to appear similar to what is used worldwide, and a distorted blue background borders the Pepsi globe.

Pepsi Max was also advertised by "Uncle Drew" with the slogan "Get Buckets."

Richard Speight, Jr. is the "Pepsi Max" delivery guy for all commercials the last two years, with ads featuring major baseball and football stars, and also with Snoop Dogg and 4-time NASCAR Sprint Cup Series champion Jeff Gordon, who worked with Pepsi Max in 2013 to create Pepsi Max & Jeff Gordon Present: Test Drive, along with Road Trip to the Race Track two years prior. Pepsi Max also sponsored Gordon's Hendrick Motorsports teammate Kasey Kahne during the 2013 Cup Series season.

On June 29, 2015, PepsiCo announced several product changes which, among other changes, announced that Pepsi Max would be renamed in North America as Pepsi Zero Sugar. The unrelated international drink will retain the Pepsi Max name.

Pepsi sponsored the Super Bowl LI Halftime Show, naming it "The Pepsi Zero Sugar Super Bowl LI Halftime Show" with its headlining performer being American singer-songwriter Lady Gaga. This halftime show became the most watched Super Bowl Halftime Show in history.

Pepsi Max's current slogan, as of the late 2010s in the US, is "Maximum taste. Zero calories."

In January, 2023, PepsiCo reformulated Pepsi Zero Sugar to reduce caffeine, remove ginseng and tweak the sweetener system.

Ingredient list
Carbonated water
Caramel color
Phosphoric acid
Aspartame
Potassium benzoate
Caffeine (reduced December 2022)
Natural flavor
Acesulfame potassium
Citric acid
Calcium disodium EDTA
Panax ginseng (removed December 2022)

See also
List of energy drinks
List of Pepsi types

References

External links
 

PepsiCo cola brands
Products introduced in 2007
Caffeinated soft drinks